This article stated the results of the World Soling Championships from 1985 till 1989. Unfortunitely not all crew names are documented in the major sources: United States Soling Association (USSA) bulletin "Leading Edge" and International Soling Association (ISA) magazine "Soling Sailing".

1985 Final results 
Only the top 20 boats are documented.

 1985 Progress

1986 Final results 

 1986 Progress

1987 Final results 

 1987 Progres

1988 Final results 

 1988 Progress

1989 Final results 

Championship not completed (lack of wind). However four races were completed. The final results of this series is stated below. The first race was sailed in a storm. During the race winds were reported over 70 km/h. During the start sequens there was even more. Out of 79 boats only 43 made it to the first mark and only 29 to the finish line! The rest of the week was characterize by light air. Since 5 races need to be completed for a valid championship, the team of Denmark won the series but not the World Championship.

 1989 Progress

Further results
For further results see:
 Soling World Championship results (1969–1979)
 Soling World Championship results (1980–1984)
 Soling World Championship results (1985–1989)
 Soling World Championship results (1990–1994)
 Soling World Championship results (2000–2009)
 Soling World Championship results (2010–2019)
 Soling World Championship results (2020–2029)

References

Soling World Championships